Roy Hamilton may refer to:

Roy Hamilton (1929–1969), American singer
Roy Hamilton (basketball) (born 1957), American basketball player
Roy "Royalty" Hamilton, American pop and R&B songwriter, record producer, and musician
Roy Hamilton, M.D., M.S., American neurologist and clinician